Badminton competitions at the 2011 Pan American Games in Guadalajara was held from October 15 to October 20 at the newly built Multipurpose Gymnasium, Revolucion Sports Complex.

Schedule

Medal summary

Medal table

Events

Qualification
There will be 44 participants each in the men's and women's divisions. The number of athletes per country to participate in the competition will be decided by ranking countries based on the total of the point rankings of the highest ranked player or team of men's/women's singles and men's/women's/mixed doubles of each country. The ranking from May 26, 2011 will be used. The host country, Mexico, and the top three ranked nations will receive four men's and women's singles slots. The fourth through seventh ranked nations will receive three men's and women's singles slots, and the eighth through eleventh ranked nations will receive two men's and women's slots. The remaining nations with entries in the badminton competition will be allowed one slot. The slots of one will be awarded to the top ranked nations starting from the twelfth ranked nation and unranked nations drawn by lot.

The total number of slots awarded, including those to the top eleven ranked teams, cannot exceed 44 per division (men's and women's). If the number of athletes confirmed by countries participating in the badminton tournament is under 44 by June 15, 2011, the quota per country will be adjusted so that the limit of slots for each ranked country is four men's and women's slots. Higher-ranked countries will receive priorities in the reallocation of slots.

Participating nations
The following countries will send athletes:

Venue
The venue for badminton will be the newly built Multipurpose Gymnasium, in the Revolucion Sports Complex. The venue will seat about 856 people. The venue is also scheduled to host the fencing events at the 2011 Pan American Games.

References

 
Events at the 2011 Pan American Games
Pan American Games
2011
Badminton tournaments in Mexico